Thomas Such (born 19 February 1963), better known by his stage name Tom Angelripper, is a German musician best known as the lead vocalist, bassist, main songwriter, and the only original remaining member of German thrash metal band Sodom.

Biography
Thomas Such was born in Gelsenkirchen on 19 February 1963, from where he learned to play bass steadily whilst working in coal mines. He then went on, as Tom Angelripper, to be the founding members of the German thrash metal band Sodom. He originally started off as just the bassist, but ended up becoming the vocalist and has done both on every studio release.

In Sodom, Angelripper plays bass and sings. Angelripper formed Sodom with guitarist Frank "Aggressor" Testegen and drummer Rainer "Bloody Monster" Focke in 1982, in a desperate bid to get out of work in the coal mines that the three had worked in.

Angelripper also founded a band called Onkel Tom Angelripper which plays metal versions of schlagers, drinking songs and Christmas carols. In addition, he worked with a side project of Sodom's touring guitarist Alex Kraft, called Desperados, which played spaghetti Western-themed heavy metal. The band later evolved independently under the name of Dezperadoz, but Angelripper still occasionally contributes.

He also plays in several other side projects, such as the German bands Bassinvaders and Die Knappen and has just guested on the brand new Warfare single the first for 27 years Cemetery Dirt  (Plastic Head Music Download)

Discography

Solo

Studio albums
Ein schöner Tag... (1996, Drakkar)
Ein Tröpfchen voller Glück (1998, Drakkar)
Ein Strauß bunter Melodien (1999, Drakkar)
Ich glaub' nicht an den Weihnachtsmann (2000, Drakkar)
Nunc Est Bibendum (2011, Drakkar)
H.E.L.D. (2014, Drakkar)
Bier Ernst (2018, Steamhammer)

Compilations
Das blaueste Album der Welt! (1999, Drakkar)
Die volle Dröhnung (2003, Drakkar)
Ich glaub' nicht an den Weihnachtsmann (2006, Drakkar)

Singles
"Delirium" (1995, Drakkar)
"Bon Scott hab' ich noch live gesehen" (2004, Drakkar)
"Warfare" Cemetery Dirt  (2018 Plastic Head Media Download)

DVDs
Lieder die das Leben schreibte (2004, Drakkar)

With Sodom

References

External links
Sodom website
Tom Interview

Sodom (band) members
German heavy metal bass guitarists
Male bass guitarists
German heavy metal singers
German male singers
Living people
People from Gelsenkirchen
1963 births
German male guitarists